Craig Noto  is an American baseball coach and former player, who is the current head baseball coach of the Wagner Seahawks. He played college baseball at John Jay.

Playing career
Noto attended St. Peter's Boys High School and played college baseball at John Jay.

Coaching career
Noto began his coaching career at his alma mater, St. Peter's Boys High School. He then became and assistant coach of St. Joseph by the Sea High School. In 2006, Noto became an assistant coach at LIU Brooklyn. Following a 9-year stint as an assistant with the Blackbirds, he took an assistant position with the Wagner Seahawks.

On May 25, 2021, Noto was named the head coach of the Wagner Seahawks.

Head coaching record

References

External links
 Wagner Seahawks bio

John Jay Bloodhounds baseball players
High school baseball coaches in the United States
LIU Brooklyn Blackbirds baseball coaches
Wagner Seahawks baseball coaches
Baseball players from New York (state)
Living people
Year of birth missing (living people)
St. Peter's Boys High School alumni